Marée Noire (French for "Black Tide" or "oil spill") may refer to:

Marée Noire, 2010 album by Beneath the Massacre
Marée noire, 2004 comic in the Inspector Canardo series

See also
Oil spill
Black Tide